Ardaneaskan is a village on the north shore of Loch Carron in Strathcarron, Ross-shire, in Highland, and is within the Scottish council area of Highland.

References

Populated places in Ross and Cromarty